Burton Chace Park is the largest public park in Marina del Rey, California.  It is named after former Mayor of Long Beach, Burton W. Chace.

The park is surrounded on three sides by water, and a green knoll rises in its center, from which the entire community can be viewed.

Public services include picnic grounds, shelters, barbecue grills, restrooms, community rooms, transient and guest docks, showers and facilities for boaters, and a seasonal cafe.  Burton Chace Park is the location of many of the community's local fairs and festivals, including the Marina del Rey Holiday Boat Parade, MarinaFest, Discover Marina del Rey, and the Marina Summer Concerts.

References

External links
Official Website
L.A. County Website

Parks in Los Angeles County, California
Marina del Rey, California
Municipal parks in California